This is a Chinese name; the family name is Zhao.

Chenyang Zhao, Beijing Film Academy graduate, a Chinese director, and screenwriter. Some of Zhao's major works are Ten Month Pregnancy, The Lying Lover, Love till Eternity, AA lifestyle, The Marriages in Laomi Family, Companionate Couple, Marry to The West, Pretty Li Hui Zhen and so on. Zhao's artistic style focuses on the realistic theme of people's bittersweet, then turn it into the light and happy urban love stories in a bold attempt. Chenyang Zhao also has a great desire to support the charity and encouraging the Sino-American Cooperation with her own brand KZ Grand Inc.

Experience 
2002, Chenyang Zhao graduated from Beijing Film Academy, both Chinese mainland director, and screenwriter. She was originally a television show host and the editor of the documentary film.

2005, Zhao was assigned as the screenwriter of TV series Ten Month Pregnancy, this is also her first time working as an independent screenwriter.

2008, Zhao was assigned as the screenwriter for the family TV series Chun Cao and collaborated with another well known screenwriter Yi Zhou. This TV series depicted how a peasant girl Chun Cao suffered in all kinds of difficulties, insisted in all dilemma, fought for her destiny and finally reached to the success.

2009, assigned as director for the first time, directed and wrote the family ethical TV series The Lying Lover. This series describes a family's separation due to the distrust between the couple, however, each family member found their own love at the end.

October 2011, Zhao directed the family TV show AA Life Style, these TV series depict the love story of two post-1980s couples: Qi He and Xin Han; Lin Zhang and Juan Cai, before and after marriage, also stories of how they fight for their lives.

2012, Zhao was assigned as the director and screenwriter of the metropolis ethical TV show Love till Eternity. To write the screenplay Zhao went to experience the life of a prisoner. This TV show won the best drama at the 2nd Sino-American International TV Festival. In May, Zhao was shooting at the suburban of Beijing for the family ethical TV show The Marriages in Laomi Family.

2013, Zhao directed the family ethical light comedy Companionate Couple. This TV show tells the story of a couple Qing Han and Ke Chen that has the stereotype of a strong man with a weak woman has faced many emotional challenges in their relationship. However, after analyzed each other, they started to treasure each other.

2015 May 10, directed the metropolitan fashion drama Marry to the West filmed in Los Angeles.

2016, Zhao directed workplace heartwarming comedy Beautiful Li Huizhen adapted from Korean drama She was Pretty.

2017, Zhao found her own brand KZ Grand Inc.

Personal life 
In 2014, Zhao transformed her studio into Beijing Moni Shengshi Film & Television Media Co, Ltd.

Major works

As director

As screenwriter

External links
 Chenyang Zhao at Baike
 Chenyang Zhao at Tencent
 Chenyang Zhao at Douban

References 

Chinese filmmakers
Living people
Year of birth missing (living people)